Behind either condyle of the lateral parts of occipital bone is a depression, the condyloid fossa (or condylar fossa), which receives the posterior margin of the superior facet of the atlas when the head is bent backward; the floor of this fossa is sometimes perforated by the condyloid canal, through which an emissary vein passes from the transverse sinus.

Additional images

See also
 Occipital condyle
 Atlas

References

External links

 Illustration (#22)

Bones of the head and neck